Barmak may refer to:

People
Barmakids, a political clan of Iranian origin, attaining high offices in the medieval Abbasid Caliphate
Khalid ibn Barmak, vizier
Yahya ibn Khalid, vizier
Ja'far ibn Yahya, vizier
Fadl ibn Yahya, vizier
Others:
Wais Barmak, Afghan politician
Siddiq Barmak, Afghan film director

Places
Barmak, Bushehr, a village in Bushehr Province, Iran
Barmak-e Bozorg, a village in Bushehr Province, Iran
Barmak-e Kuchek, a village in Bushehr Province, Iran